Wallace E. Schreiber (born April 15, 1962) is a Canadian retired professional ice hockey right winger.

Career
Schreiber was drafted 152nd overall by the Washington Capitals in the 1982 NHL Entry Draft. He would go on to play a total of 41 games in the National Hockey League with the Minnesota North Stars. In 1989, Schreiber moved to Germany with Schwenninger ERC and later played for EC Hedos München, EV Landshut and the Hannover Scorpions. He remained active in Germany until his retirement in 2006 at the age of 44.

Schreiber was a member of the Canadian national team in the 1988, 1992 and 1994 Winter Olympics, winning two silver medals.

His nephew is Mike Schreiber of the Hannover Indians.

Career statistics

Regular season and playoffs

International

External links 

1962 births
Living people
Canadian expatriate ice hockey players in Germany
Canadian expatriate ice hockey players in the United States
Canadian ice hockey forwards
EV Landshut players
Fort Saskatchewan Traders players
Fort Wayne Komets players
Hannover Scorpions players
Ice hockey players at the 1988 Winter Olympics
Ice hockey players at the 1992 Winter Olympics
Ice hockey players at the 1994 Winter Olympics
Kalamazoo Wings (1974–2000) players
Medalists at the 1992 Winter Olympics
Medalists at the 1994 Winter Olympics
Minnesota North Stars players
Olympic ice hockey players of Canada
Olympic medalists in ice hockey
Olympic silver medalists for Canada
Regina Pats players
Schwenningen ERC players
Schwenninger Wild Wings players
Ice hockey people from Edmonton
Washington Capitals draft picks